Honda Automobile (China) Co., Ltd. previously known as China Honda Automobile Co., Ltd. (CHAC) was a joint venture automobile manufacturing plant owned by Honda and Chinese companies GAC Group and Dongfeng Motor Group. The plant solely produced vehicles for international exports, while vehicles for domestic market supply are manufactured by 50-50 joint ventures Dongfeng Honda and Guangqi Honda.

History
Honda Automobile (China) Co., Ltd. was a joint venture of Honda (65%), GAC Group (25%) and Dongfeng Motor Group (10%), incorporated on 8 September 2003. It was located in Guangzhou. Dongfeng and GAC had formed separate joint venture with Honda as Dongfeng Honda (in July 2003) and Guangqi Honda (in 1998) respectively. In 2018, Dongfeng made a public invitation to buy their stake in Honda China.

It was reported in 2004, that the joint venture would export most of their products to Europe, as well as Southeast Asia. Exports to Canada commenced in 2011.

As of 2016, the plant exports mainly to the Middle East, Latin America, Russia and Africa.

On 1 April 2020, Guangqi Honda joint venture officially absorbed the plant and renamed it as the Guangzhou Development District Factory. The absorbed plant will produce up to 50,000 vehicles annually, boosting total annual production capacity of Guangqi Honda to 770,000 units per year. Under the new name the plant will begin producing Accord for the Chinese domestic market, while continuing to produce and export the City model for the Mexican market up to 2020.

Footnotes

See also
List of Honda assembly plants

References

External links
 

Car manufacturers of China
Honda factories
Dongfeng Motor joint ventures
GAC Group joint ventures
Chinese-foreign joint-venture companies
Vehicle manufacturing companies established in 2003
Chinese companies established in 2003
Vehicle manufacturing companies disestablished in 2020
2020 disestablishments in China